Jana Rybářová (born 13 February 1978) is a Czech synchronized swimmer.

Jana competed in the women's duet at the 2000 Summer Olympics with her partner, Soňa Bernardová, and finished in fifteenth place.

References

1978 births
Living people
Czech synchronized swimmers
Olympic synchronized swimmers of the Czech Republic
Synchronized swimmers at the 2000 Summer Olympics
Sportspeople from Brno